A signaculum was a lead "dog tag" in a leather pouch carried by Roman soldiers around their neck. It seems to have had personal details (acting to identify a body the same way a modern dog tag does) with a seal or stamp to authenticate it. 

Similar items for identifying civilian goods and equipment have been found as well. Signacula of this variety were not discs that were carried on one's person as with the Roman army equivalent, but are more like modern-day product labels, giving information on the item's manufacturer and affiliates.

History 

Although the origins of exactly when or why the Roman army decided to use the signaculum for their soldiers are not clear, there are, regardless, references to its use in some historical documents, which indicate its composition (lead), as well as the fact that it is given after it is determined a man is fit to serve the legion.
In a document from 295, Maximilian of Tebessa, an early Christian martyr, is being recruited as an officer in the Roman army against his wishes:

Other forms 

Labels

Signaculum also describes the stamps on some Roman Imperial goods, and are used to identify the manufacturer and/or other pertinent facts about the item.

Mark of slaves

Slaves were also known to wear dog tags on their person, typically in the form of an unremovable metal collar that would be inscribed with messages such as:

These, along with branding and tattooing, were common ways for Roman slaves to be separated from the rest of the Roman social system, and easily  punishable should they make their escape.

Stamps

It is possible that signacula that were carried by domestic workers were used as stamps to record usage of tools, and debts from one to another.

Replacement by the soldier's mark
There is some evidence suggesting that, by the time of the late Roman army, it became common practice to instead give soldiers that were found to be fit for service in the legion an indelible Soldier's Mark, possibly to discourage desertion by making any former or deserting soldiers clearly discernible.

In De Re Militari (AD 390), one of the few writings of Roman military writer Vegetius Renatus, it is stated that, after the initial selection process, a recruit is then placed through a four-month testing period to ensure his physical capability.

References 

Military of ancient Rome